In metric geometry, the Reshetnyak gluing theorem gives information on the structure of a geometric object built by using as building blocks other geometric objects, belonging to a well defined class. Intuitively, it states that a manifold obtained by joining (i.e. "gluing") together, in a precisely defined way, other manifolds having a given property inherit that very same property.

The theorem was first stated and proved by Yurii Reshetnyak in 1968.

Statement

Theorem: Let  be complete locally compact geodesic metric spaces of CAT curvature , and  convex subsets which are isometric. Then the manifold , obtained by gluing all  along all , is also of CAT curvature .

For an exposition and a proof of the Reshetnyak Gluing Theorem, see .

Notes

References
, translated in English as:
.
.

Theorems in geometry
Metric geometry